Innambur is a village in the Kumbakonam taluk of Thanjavur district, Tamil Nadu, India.

Demographics 

As per the 2001 census, Innambur had a total population of 2464 with 1207 males and 1257 females. The sex ratio was 1041. The literacy rate was 73.03.

References 

 

Villages in Thanjavur district